The discography of British trip hop band Massive Attack consists of five studio albums, three compilation albums, five remix albums, one soundtrack album, five extended plays, eighteen singles and twenty-seven music videos. The group was founded in 1988 by musicians Robert "3D" Del Naja, Adrian "Tricky" Thaws, Grantley "Daddy G" Marshall, and Andrew "Mushroom" Vowles in Bristol, England. Prior to the formation of Massive Attack, all four were members of British sound system The Wild Bunch.

Massive Attack's debut album Blue Lines was released in 1991, and was a pioneering force in the forming of the fusion genre dubbed trip hop.  Blue Lines peaked at number 13 on the UK Albums Chart, and was certified Double Platinum in the United Kingdom. The album spawned four singles, three of which charted in the top 100 of the UK Singles Chart. In 1994, Massive Attack released their second album, Protection, which peaked at number 4 in the UK. In 1998, the group released their third album, Mezzanine, which peaked at number 1 in the UK and Australia, and was the group's first release to chart in the United States. 100th Window was released in 2003, peaking at number 1 in the UK and three other countries.

In 2006, Massive Attack released Collected, a compilation of the group's singles and music videos. The compilation charted in seven countries, and was certified platinum in the UK. Their fifth studio album Heligoland was released in 2010. It peaked at number 6 in the UK and was certified Gold.

Albums

Studio albums

Compilation albums

Remix albums

Soundtrack albums

Extended plays

Singles

Other charted songs

Other song(s)
I Against I ft. Mos Def - Blade II (soundtrack)

Remixes
Massive Attack / 3D have remixed the following artists:
Neneh Cherry
Lisa Stansfield
Jesus Loves You
Nusrat Fateh Ali Khan
Kwanzaa Posse
Les Negresses Vertes
Peter Gabriel
Nas
U2
Indo Aminata
Garbage
Manic Street Preachers
Unkle
Primal Scream
A Perfect Circle
The Dandy Warhols
Lupine Howl
Run the Jewels
Paul McCartney

Music videos

Notes

References

External links
 Official website
 Massive Attack at AllMusic
 
 

Discographies of British artists
Electronic music discographies